Haaser is a surname. Notable people with the surname include:

Hans Richter-Haaser (1912–1980), German classical pianist
Raphael Haaser (born 1997), Austrian alpine ski racer
Ricarda Haaser (born 1993), Austrian alpine ski racer

See also
Hauser